The Eurovision Young Musicians 1988 was the fourth edition of the Eurovision Young Musicians, held at Concertgebouw in Amsterdam, Netherlands on 31 May 1988. Organised by the European Broadcasting Union (EBU) and host broadcaster Nederlandse Omroep Stichting (NOS), musicians from six countries participated in the televised final. A total of sixteen countries took part in the competition. All participants had to be younger than 19 and performed a classical piece of their choice accompanied by the Radio Filharmonisch Orkest conducted by Sergiu Comissiona.  and  made their début, and  withdrew from the 1988 contest.

The non-qualified countries were Belgium, Cyprus, Denmark, France, Ireland, Netherlands, Spain, Sweden, Switzerland and Yugoslavia. For the second year in a row, the host country did not qualify for the final. The semifinal took place between 26 and 27 May, a few days before the televised final. Julian Rachlin of Austria won the contest, with Norway and Italy placing second and third respectively.

Location

The Concertgebouw (also known as the "Royal Concertgebouw") a concert hall in Amsterdam, Netherlands, was the host venue for the 1988 edition of the Eurovision Young Musicians.

The Dutch term "concertgebouw" literally translates into English as "concert building". On 11 April 2013, on occasion of the building's 125th anniversary, Queen Beatrix bestowed the Royal Title "Koninklijk" upon the building, as she did previously on to the Royal Concertgebouw Orchestra. Because of its highly regarded acoustics, the Concertgebouw is considered one of the finest concert halls in the world, along with places such as Boston's Symphony Hall and the Musikverein in Vienna.

Format
Martine Bijl was the host of the 1988 contest. Each participating country were able to send male or female artists who were no older than 19 years of age, to represent them by playing a classical piece of their choice accompanied by the Radio Filharmonisch Orkest conducted under Sergiu Comissiona. Queen Beatrix of the Netherlands was a special guest at the contest.

Results

Preliminary round
A total of sixteen countries took part in the preliminary round of the 1988 contest, of which six qualified to the televised grand final. The following countries failed to qualify.

 
  Cyprus
 
 
 
  (host)

Final
Awards were given to the top three countries. The table below highlights these using gold, silver, and bronze. The placing results of the remaining participants is unknown and never made public by the European Broadcasting Union.

Jury members
The jury members consisted of the following:

 – Anette Faaborg (host of the Eurovision Young Musicians 1986)
 – Osmo Vänskä
 – Pascal Rogé
 – Elmar Weingarten
 – Roberto Benzi (President)
 – Marco Riaskoff
 – Herman Krebbers
 – Sören Hermansson
 – William Pleeth

Broadcasting
EBU members from the following countries broadcast the final round. It was the first time that commentary boxes were provided in the venue.

See also
 Eurovision Song Contest 1988

References

External links 
 

Eurovision Young Musicians by year
1988 in music
1988 in the Netherlands
Music in Amsterdam
Music festivals in the Netherlands
Events in Amsterdam
May 1988 events in Europe